Central & Eastern European Game Awards (CEEGA) are annual awards that recognize the best games from Central and Eastern Europe. Award ceremonies have been held since 2018 in Poznań.

2018
The first year was held on 13 October 2018. Frostpunk won the Best Game and Best Design awards. Other winners included Kingdom Come: Deliverance for Best Narration, Chuchel for Best Visual Art, and Ruiner  for Best Audio.

2019
Second year was held on 19 October 2019. Mordhau won the Best Game award.

2020
Third year was held on 9 December 2020. Nominations were announced in December 2020. Creaks received the highest number of nominations.

2021
Fourth year was held on 22 October 2021. Cyberpunk 2077 won the Best Game award.

2022
Another year, more winners of CEEGA awards. This year,  Dying Light 2 by Techland won the Best Game category! The winners were announced on October 8, 2022!

References

External links
Official Website

Awards established in 2018
Video game awards